Lauren Pattison is an English stand-up comedian from Newcastle. She was nominated for the best newcomer award at the 2017 Edinburgh Festival and for best show in 2022.

Career

Pattison was a finalist in the 2015 Chortle Student Comedy Awards and the 2016 BBC New Comedy Award. She was nominated for the best newcomer award at the 2017 Edinburgh Festival for her show Lady Muck.

Having started doing comedy aged 18, after university Pattison supported Katherine Ryan on tour. Pattison has played at comedy festivals and toured in Australia,  New Zealand, and Canada.

She returned to the Edinburgh festival in 2018 with her show Peachy.

In April 2019, Pattison began co-hosting the podcast Conversations Against Living Miserably with Aaron Gillies supported by Dave.

In September 2020 she appeared as a featured performer alongside Mo Omar and Tom Lucy on the first episode of BBC Three's Stand Up for Live Comedy filmed in Bristol and hosted by Jayde Adams.

References

Living people
Year of birth missing (living people)
Place of birth missing (living people)
English women comedians
English stand-up comedians